Aqamirlu (also Romanized as Āqāmīrlū; also known as Āghāmīrlū) is a village in Seyyedan Rural District, Abish Ahmad District, Kaleybar County, East Azerbaijan Province, Iran. At the 2006 census, its population was 349, in 71 families.

References 

Populated places in Kaleybar County